The Kinetic Dynamic Suspension System (KDSS) technology was employed initially in the Lexus GX 470, and subsequently the 200 Series Toyota Land Cruiser. The system was invented and developed by Kinetic Pty Ltd, a small R&D company based in Dunsborough, Western Australia. It optimally adjusts front and rear stabilizers based on a set of interconnected hydraulic cylinders.  The interconnection is made up of hydraulic piping and a control cylinder which is located at the frame rail.  KDSS, which is fully mechanical, can disengage the stabilizer bars (the bars are jointed, allowing movement independent of one another). This system will not engage during normal driving conditions, when hydraulic pressure is equal. In off-road conditions, KDSS activates when it senses that a wheel has dropped.

The Kinetic Dynamic Suspension System was first available as an option on the model year 2004 Lexus GX 470, a sport utility vehicle that was only sold in North America, and based roughly on the 120 Series Land Cruiser Prado. The system was also introduced in similar form on the 2008 Toyota Land Cruiser. For the 2008 Lexus LX 570, an electro-mechanical suspension was employed, retaining the function of the KDSS design but adding electronic components.

Vehicles 
Models that have adopted the Kinetic Dynamic Suspension System to date include:
 2010–2016 Toyota 4Runner Trail Edition 
 2017–present Toyota 4Runner TRD Off-Road
 2008–present Toyota Land Cruiser 
 2004–present Lexus GX
 2010–present Toyota Prado

See also
 Toyota TEMS
 Citroën Hydractive

Notes 

Lexus
Toyota
Automotive suspension technologies
Automotive technology tradenames
Vehicle safety technologies
Auto parts
Mechanical power control